The Wheeler–Ingalls House is a historic house at 51 Summer Street in Rehoboth, Massachusetts.  The oldest portion of this -story saltbox house may have been built before 1710 by Samuel Millard; its left side exhibits a number of First Period construction techniques.  In 1760 it was purchased by Dr. John Wheeler, and it was in the Ingalls family at the time of the American Revolutionary War.  It is one of the least-altered houses of the period in Rehoboth.

The house was listed on the National Register of Historic Places in 1983.

See also
National Register of Historic Places listings in Bristol County, Massachusetts

References

Buildings and structures in Rehoboth, Massachusetts
Houses in Bristol County, Massachusetts
Houses on the National Register of Historic Places in Bristol County, Massachusetts